Dorothy Walker may refer to:
 Dorothy Walker (critic) (1929–2002), Irish art collector and critic
 Dorothy Walker (journalist and writer), British journalist and author
 Dorothy Walker Bush (1901–1992), wife of Prescott Bush